Terran Republic may refer to:

 Terran Republic, a faction in the PlanetSide video game series
 Terran Republic, a government in the novels of Charles Gannon